Denzil Dean Harber (25 January 1909, Streatham, – 31 August 1966) was an early British Trotskyist leader and later in his life a prominent British ornithologist.

Denzil Dean Harber was born at 25 Fairmile Avenue, Streatham on 25 January 1909. His father was a ship's carpenter turned architect, his mother the daughter of a successful south London butcher.

During the First World War the family moved to Sussex , where they lived in a succession of houses at Climping, Lewes, and Eastbourne and finally at the Black Mill, Ore near Hastings.

From a very early age he developed an interest in many aspects of natural history including reptiles, butterflies and moths, fossils and birds.

Suffering from chronic asthma from infancy his formal education was spasmodic. He was however taught how to learn, and how to plan courses of study himself by an inspiring private tutor. Developing what became a lifelong interest in languages he taught himself French  and German.

It is not clear how he became interested in politics, but by the end of 1926 he was reading various anti-imperialist pamphlets published by the Labour Research Department. By March 1927 he had read the first volume of Capital. According to John McIlroy (see references) he joined the Communist Party of Great Britain (CPGB) in 1929.

It was undoubtedly this political interest that led him to start to teach himself Russian and then to study Russian commerce at the London School of Economics (LSE).   In the summer of 1932, he travelled to the Soviet Union as an interpreter for a Canadian journalist with the intention of settling there but was disillusioned by what he found.  Returning home, he found copies of the Bulletin of the Opposition published in Russian by the Trotskyist Left Opposition in Henderson's bookshop in the Charing Cross Road.

Harber expected that the journalist who employed him would publish a full account of their visit to Russia and felt because he went as her employee it would not be right for him to publish his own, but in fact the journalist never did. However Harber did write a short report entitled  Seeing Soviet Russia for the Lent Term 1933 issue of the student journal of the LSE Clare Market Review which included  how he had witnessed  famine in the Russian countryside and the ruin of Soviet agriculture. This is one of the very few contemporary accounts of Russian conditions written by an outside visitor fluent in Russian.

In 1932 Harber joined the Communist League, the successor of the Balham Group - an opposition group in the CPGB - and one of the first independent Trotskyist groups in the country. Trotsky advised the group to enter the Independent Labour Party (ILP), which had just disaffiliated from the Labour Party. Trotsky believed that the group should work for a "Bolshevik transformation of the party".

The majority of the Communist League argued against joining the ILP in favour of maintaining an open party, but allowed thirty of its members led by Harber to form a secretive "Bolshevik-Leninist Fraction" in the ILP. This difference in orientation essentially split the party, and in November 1934, sixty Trotskyist ILPers officially formed the Marxist Group, led by Harber.

While, perhaps due to this delay and infighting, the group never achieved the influence hoped for by Trotsky, it did win new members, including C. L. R. James. Ted Grant also joined the organisation, having moved from South Africa.  By the ILP Conference of 1935, it claimed a similar strength to the Revolutionary Policy Committee, which was sympathetic to the Communist Party of Great Britain.

However, Harber now left the ILP to join the Labour Party, as Trotsky urged, forming the Militant Group.  Harber later led this group into the Revolutionary Socialist League (RSL), of which he was a secretary for a time. In 1944 the RSL fused with the rival Workers International League to form the Revolutionary Communist Party (1944-1949].

Harber was one of the British delegates to the founding conference of the Fourth International  in Paris on 3 September 1938 and together with C. L. R. James was elected to represent Britain on the International Executive Committee.

Later that month he married Mary Whittaker, whom he had first met in the Labour League of Youth. The following year he moved with her to Eastbourne in Sussex, where he became a Co-operative Society insurance agent, a job he held for the rest of his life.

By 1937 he had revived his interest in natural history and in particular in ornithology. In Sussex he started to contribute to the South-Eastern Bird Report. That for 1939 records his  sighting of a snow-bunting at Birling Gap  near Eastbourne on 24 September that year. For the next ten years he combined political activity with ornithology and his love of Chelsea Football Club.

Harber had long opposed Gerry Healy, but after the Revolutionary Communist Party was dissolved in 1949 he briefly followed many of his comrades into Healy's group, The Club.  However, after publishing one article in the Club's journal, Marxist Review, he  abandoned active politics (though not his political beliefs) in favour of ornithology.

In 1948 the Sussex section of  the South Eastern Bird Report became an independent publication The Sussex Bird Report under the editorship of Grahame des Forges. In 1949 Harber became the report's  co-editor and from 1956 its sole editor, a position he held  until 1962, when he relinquished control to the newly formed Sussex Ornithological Society. His and des  Forges's A Guide to the Birds of Sussex was published in 1963.

Very early in his ornithological career Harber had come to the conclusion that a series of rare and exotic birds allegedly shot in an area around Hastings between 1903 and 1916  (the so-called Hastings rarities) were forgeries. In the manuscript of A Guide to the Birds of Sussex he and des Forges rejected them. By the time the Guide was published a full exposure of the forgery had been published in British Birds (magazine) (1962  vol 55  8 283-349).

Harber's reputation as an ornithologist increased over the years. In 1955, in an extended review of  The Birds of  the Soviet Union for British Birds, he brought together his knowledge of Russian and ornithology. In 1959 he was invited to join the British Birds Rarities Committee, the official adjudicator of rare bird records in Britain, and in 1963 he became its Honorary Secretary.

He died on 31 August 1966. Harber was survived by his wife Mary and three sons Julian,Paul and Guy

Obituary

British Birds Vol.60 1967 pps 84-86

Selected writings

Ornithology

"Mid-Season Movements of Swifts in Sussex", British Birds Vol. 45, 1952, pp. 216–218

Special Review of The Birds of the Soviet Union, British Birds Vol. 48, 1955, pp. 218–224, 268–276, 313–319, 343–348, 404–410, 447–453, 505-511

"Slender-Billed Gull in Sussex", British Birds, Vol. 55, 1962, pp. 169–171

(with G. des Forges) A Guide to the Birds of Sussex, Edinburgh, 1963

Chapter on Yugoslavia in A Guide to Bird-Watching in Europe, ed. J. Ferguson-Lees, Q. Hockliffe and K. Zweeres, London, 1972

References

Politics
 John McIlroy, "The Establishment of Intellectual Orthodoxy and the Stalinisation of British Communism 1928-1933; Appendix", Past and Present, 192, August 2006
 Sam Bornstein and AI Richardson, Against the Stream: A History of the Trotskyist Movement in Britain, 1924-1938, London, 1986
 Sam Bornstein and Al Richardson, War and the International: A History of the Trotskyist Movement in Britain, 1937-1949, London 1986

Ornithology
 Tony Marr, "From Pagham Harbour to Denzil Harber", British Birds Vol. 96, no. 3, 2003, pp. 132–124

Specific

Archives
Harber Archive at the Marxists Internet Archive
Harber's papers at the Modern Records Centre, University of Warwick
Three letters from Harber in the Trotsky archives at Harvard University

External links
The British Section of the Left Opposition

British Trotskyists
1909 births
1966 deaths
People from Streatham
English ornithologists
Alumni of the London School of Economics
Communist Party of Great Britain members
Communist League (UK, 1932) members
Revolutionary Communist Party (UK, 1944) members
20th-century British zoologists
Place of death missing